Maria Antonietta is a feminine Italian blended given name from the root names Miriam and Antonius. Notable people referred to by this name include the following:

 Princess Maria Antonietta of Bourbon-Two Sicilies (1851–1938) daughter of Francis, Count of Trapani and Maria Isabella of Austria
 Maria Antonietta Avanzo, first Italian female racetrack driver
 Maria Antonietta Beluzzi (1930–1997), Italian actress
 María Antonietta Berriozábal (born 1941), American activist
 Maria Antonietta Macciocchi (1922–2007) was an Italian journalist, writer, feminist and politician
 Maria Antonietta Picconi (1869–1926), Italian composer and pianist
 Maria Antonietta Torriani, Italian journalist and fiction writer

See also

Maria Antonia
María Antonieta
Maria Antonina
Marie Antoinette (disambiguation)

Notes

Italian feminine given names